Guido Barbujani (born January 31, 1955) is an Italian population geneticist, evolutionary biologist and literary author born in Adria, who has worked with the State University of New York at Stony Brook (NY), University of Padua, and University of Bologna. He has taught at the University of Ferrara since 1996.

Works
A population geneticist by training, Barbujani has been working on several aspects of human genetic variation. In collaboration with Robert R. Sokal, he pioneered the statistical comparison of patterns of genetic and linguistic variation, showing that language differences may contribute to reproductive isolation, and hence promote genetic divergence between populations.

His analyses of geographic patterns of genetic variation in Europe support Luca Cavalli-Sforza's Neolithic demic diffusion model, or the idea that farming spread in the Neolithic mainly because farmers did, and not by cultural transmission. There are two implications of this finding: first, that most Europeans' ancestors, up to Neolithic times, did not live in geographical Europe, but rather in the Near East; and second, that the early farmers expanding west carried with them their genes, their technologies, and possibly their languages.

His studies of the amount of DNA differentiation among human populations, and of its spatial distribution, led to the conclusion that traditional human racial classifications fail to account for most of the existing patterns of genetic variation. Rather, it seems that genetic variation is largely uncorrelated across genes, which, if confirmed, would explain why no consensus was ever reached on a catalog of human biological races. This activity has also resulted in publications for the general public.

His recent DNA studies focus on genetic characterization of ancient human populations, such as Paleolithic anatomically modern humans of Cro-Magnoid morphology, and groups like the Etruscans and the Sardinians from the Nuragic era in the Neolithic.

Barbujani is the author of three novels.

Quote
"The idea that all humans naturally belong to one of a few biological types or races that evolved in isolation was unchallenged for centuries, but large-scale modern studies failed to associate racial labels with recognizable genetic clusters." (Barbujani G., 2005, p. 215)

References

Scientific Bibliography
 Barbujani G. and Sokal R.R. (1990) Zones of sharp genetic change in Europe are also linguistic boundaries.  Proceedings of the National Academy of Sciences USA 87:1816-1819.
 Barbujani G., Magagni A., Minch E. and Cavalli-Sforza L.L. (1997) An apportionment of human DNA diversity.  Proceedings of the National Academy of Sciences USA 94:4516-4519.
 Barbujani G. and Bertorelle G. (2001) Genetics and the population history of Europe.  Proceedings of the National Academy of Sciences USA 98:22-25.
 Chikhi L., Destro-Bisol G., Bertorelle G., Pascali V., and Barbujani G.  (1998) Clines of nuclear DNA markers suggest a recent, Neolithic ancestry of the European gene pool. Proceedings of the National Academy of Sciences USA, 95:9053-9058.
 Romualdi C., Balding D., Nasidze I.S., Risch G., Robichaux M., Sherry S., Stoneking  M., Batzer M. and Barbujani G. (2002) Patterns of human diversity, within and among continents, inferred from biallelic DNA polymorphisms. Genome Research 12:602-612.
 Barbujani G. and Goldstein D.B. (2004) Africans and Asians abroad: Genetic diversity in Europe. Annual Review of Genomics and Human Genetics 5:119-150.
 Dupanloup I., Bertorelle G., Chikhi L. and Barbujani G. (2004) Estimating the impact of prehistoric admixture on the Europeans’ genome. Molecular Biology and Evolution 21:1361-1372
 Barbujani G. (2005) Human races: Classifying people vs. understanding diversity. Current Genomics 6:215-226
 Belle E.M.S., Ramakrishnan U., Mountain J. and Barbujani G. (2006) Serial coalescent simulations suggest a weak genealogical relationship between Etruscans and modern Tuscans. Proceedings of the National Academy of Sciences USA 103:8012-8017.
 Caramelli D., Milani L., Vai S., Modi A., Pecchioli E., Girardi M., Pilli E., Lari M., Lippi B., Ronchitelli A., Mallegni F., Casoli A., Bertorelle G., Barbujani G. (2008) A 28,000 years old Cro–Magnon mtDNA sequence differs from all potentially contaminating modern sequences. PLoS ONE 3:e2700.
 Ghirotto S., Mona S., Benazzo A., Paparazzo F., Caramelli D., Barbujani G. (2010) Inferring genealogical processes from patterns of Bronze–age and modern DNA variation in Sardinia. Molecular Biology and Evolution 27:775–786.
 Barbujani G. and Colonna V. (2010) Human genome diversity: Frequently asked questions. Trends in Genetics 26:285–295.

Bibliography (Books, Nonfiction)
 {{cite book|first=Guido|last=Barbujani|year=2006|title=L'invenzione delle razze. Bompiani, Milan. Portuguese translation: A invencão das racas (2007)|publisher=Editora Contexto|location=São Paulo, Brazil}}
 
 
 

Bibliography (Books, Fiction)
 Dilettanti. Marsilio, Venice, 1994 (Republished as: Dilettanti. Quattro viaggi nei dintorni di Charles Darwin. Sironi, Milan, 2004)
 Dopoguerra. Sironi, Milan, 2002.
 Questione di razza''. Mondadori, Milan, 2003.

External links
 https://web.archive.org/web/20080731132037/http://web.unife.it/progetti/genetica/Guido/ : Personal webpage, with access to pdfs of scientific articles.
 https://www.sciencedaily.com/releases/2006/05/060526065706.htm : ancient Etruscans unlikely ancestors of modern Tuscans. Science Daily, April 2006.
 https://web.archive.org/web/20081217011325/http://www.festivaldellamente.it/pdf/ENG_2007_programme.pdf : taped interview on human diversity (in Italian), October 2007.

1955 births
Living people
People from the Province of Rovigo
Italian male writers
Population geneticists
Italian geneticists